Lysinibacillus cresolivorans is a  Gram-positive, facultatively anaerobic, rod-shaped and endospore-forming bacterium from the genus of Lysinibacillus.

References

Bacillaceae
Bacteria described in 2015